Bab-e Kahnuj (also Romanized as Bāb-e Kahnūj) is a village in Sarduiyeh Rural District, Sarduiyeh District, Jiroft County, Kerman Province, Iran. At the 2006 census, its population was 76, in 20 families.

References 

Populated places in Jiroft County